The Women's Royal Air Force (WRAF) was the women's branch of the Royal Air Force.  It existed in two separate incarnations: the Women's Royal Air Force from 1918 to 1920 and the Women's Royal Air Force from 1949 to 1994.

On 1 February 1949, the name of the First World War organisation was revived when the Women's Auxiliary Air Force, which had been founded in 1939, was re-established on a regular footing as the Women's Royal Air Force. The WRAF and the RAF grew closer over the following decades, with increasing numbers of trades opened to women, and the two services formally merged in 1994, marking the full assimilation of women into the British forces and the end of the Women's Royal Air Force.

The Central Band of the WRAF, one of only two all-female bands in the British Armed Forces, was disbanded in 1972. Some of its musicians transferred to the Band of the Women's Royal Army Corps.

Strength

The target strength had been a force of around 90,000, figures are unreliable until 1 August 1918, when the strength was 15,433, approximately 5,000 recruits and 10,000 transferred from the  predecessor organisations.  The first incarnation never exceeded 25,000.

Depots
Depots were opened in 1918 at Handsworth College, in Glasgow, at RAF Flowerdown, RAF Spitalgate, near Grantham, and at York. In the 1950s the WRAF Depot and WRAF Officer Cadet Training Unit were opened at RAF Hawkinge in Kent.

Ranks
The WRAF inherited its rank structure from its predecessor, the WAAF. As with WAAF practice (from 1940), other ranks held standard RAF ranks, but officers used a separate ranking system until 1968, when they too adopted RAF officer ranks.

These ranks were introduced in 1949. The First World War service used different ranks.

List of Commandants WRAF
Gertrude Crawford, 1918
Violet Douglas-Pennant, May–September 1918
Helen Gwynne-Vaughan, September 1918 – 1920

List of Directors WRAF

Air Commandant Dame Felicity Hanbury, 1949–1950
Air Commandant Dame Nancy Salmon, 1950–1956
Air Commandant Dame Henrietta Barnett, 1956–1959
Air Commandant Dame Anne Stephens, 1959–1962
Air Commandant Dame Jean Conan Doyle, 1962–1966
Air Commodore Dame Felicity Hill, 1966–1969
Air Commodore Philippa Marshall, 1969–1973
Air Commodore Molly Allott, 1973–1976
Air Commodore Joy Tamblin, 1976–1980
Air Commodore Helen Renton, 1980–1986
Air Commodore Shirley Jones, 1986–1989
Air Commodore Ruth Montague, 1989–1994

See also 
 Air Transport Auxiliary
 Patricia Howard
 Women Airforce Service Pilots, US equivalent
 Women's Royal Army Corps
 Women's Royal Naval Service

Notes

References

Further reading 

BE Escott, Women in Air Force Blue: the story of women in the Royal Air Force from 1918 to the present day - 1989 - Stephens
KB Beauman, Partners in Blue: The Story of Women's Service with the Royal Air Force - 1971 - Hutchinson Radius

Royal Air Force
All-female military units and formations
Military units and formations established in 1949
Sex segregation
1949 establishments in the United Kingdom
1994 disestablishments in the United Kingdom
Women's organisations based in the United Kingdom